Anne Elizabeth Pusey is director of the Jane Goodall Institute Research Center and  a professor of evolutionary anthropology at Duke University. Since the early 1990s, Pusey has been archiving the data collected from the Gombe chimpanzee project. The collection housed at Duke University consists of a computerized database that Pusey oversees. In addition to archiving Jane Goodall’s research from Gombe, she is involved in field study and advising students at Gombe . She was elected a member of the National Academy of Sciences in 2022.

Education and early life

Pusey graduated from Oxford University in 1970 with a degree in zoology and became a field assistant to Jane Goodall at the Gombe research facility in Tanzania in August 1970. Dr. Pusey and another researcher, Craig Packer, left Gombe in 1975 after the kidnapping of some of their fellow researchers. Pusey did not return to Gombe until 1982, after receiving her doctorate in ethology from Stanford University. She did her doctoral research at the Serengeti Wildlife Research Institute. Pusey became a professor at the University of Minnesota in 1983. She and her husband and former fellow researcher, Craig Packer split the position and worked part of the time at the University and part of the time researching in Africa. It was while at the University of Minnesota that Dr. Pusey started archiving the 50 years of research and field notes from Jane Goodall and her research assistants at Gombe. She eventually became Director of the Jane Goodall Institute's Center for Primate Studies and a McKnight Distinguished University Professor of Ecology, Evolution and Behavior at Minnesota University.

Work 

Pusey's research interests lie mostly in the social structure and social evolution of the more social animal species. She primarily studies lions, chimpanzees, and humans. In addition to focusing on social bonds, she is also interested in competition and cooperation amongst members of these groups. Her research projects include areas of female social interactions including patterns of settlement and relationships between only females. Additionally, she focuses on male allies and their significance. She also works together with faculty from other universities on many other aspects of the life and health of these social groups of mammals. One area that she collaborates on is the study of the simian immunodeficiency virus (SIVcpz) also known as the chimpanzee version of aids, and its effects on the subjects . She is known for her research on the virus .

Personal life 
Pusey was married to Craig Packer for twenty years.

Media 
Pusey has authored or co-authored 21 book selections, 114 journal entries, and 6 conference papers.

In 1989, Pusey and Craig Packer released their documentary, Queen of Beasts. The documentary shows Pusey and Packer's research on examining the social hierarchy of lion prides and outlines why they are the only big cats who live in groups. The documentary was filmed in Serengeti National Park in East Africa and shows the couple with their children, Jonathan and Catherine Packer.

Awards 
Fellow of the Animal Behavior Society. Animal Behavior Society. 2013

James B. Duke Professor of Evolutionary Anthropology, Duke University. Duke University. 2010

Fellow. American Academy of Arts and Sciences. 2005

McKnight Distinguished University Professor, University of Minnesota. 1999

Fellowship. John Simon Guggenheim Memorial Foundation. 1990

References

Year of birth missing (living people)
Living people
Duke University faculty
Alumni of the University of Oxford
Primatologists
Members of the United States National Academy of Sciences